Nancy Argenziano (born January 1, 1955) is a former state legislator in Florida and served as chairman of the Florida Public Service Commission. She was the Reform Party of Florida's candidate for lieutenant governor in 2018.

Personal life

Argenziano was born in Brooklyn, New York, and moved to Florida in 1971. She has one son.

Political career

Argenziano was first elected to the Florida House of Representatives in 1996 and served there until her election to the Florida Senate in 2002. In 2007, Florida governor Charlie Crist appointed her to the state's Public Service Commission.

A member of the Republican Party throughout her legislative career, Argenziano switched to become an independent in 2011.

In 2001, Argenziano delivered 25 lbs of gift-wrapped cow manure to Jodi Chase, a lobbyist for Associated Industries of Florida. AIF represents nursing home providers in Florida and was supporting SB1202, a nursing home reform bill which sought to limit damages in cases where a death did not occur or injuries were not deemed serious. Argenziano was one of the only state senators opposing the bill. Chase apparently entered Argenziano's office uninvited to watch a floor debate around the bill, angering the legislator. The manure was later delivered to Chase at a lobbyist area in the  Florida State Capitol Building, drawing a rebuke from the AIF and then-House Speaker Tom Feeney, but gaining Argenziano many signatures from colleagues in a petition of support.

References

External links

|-

Florida state senators
Members of the Florida House of Representatives
1955 births
Living people
Women state legislators in Florida
20th-century American politicians
20th-century American women politicians
21st-century American politicians
21st-century American women politicians
Candidates in the 2018 United States elections
Politicians from Brooklyn
Reform Party of the United States of America politicians
Florida Independents
Florida Republicans